Alectryon coriaceus, known as the beach bird's eye, or beach alectryon is a rainforest tree of the soapberry family found in eastern Australia. The specific epithet coriaceus refers to the leathery thick leaves. Leaflets are 4 to 12 cm long, and 2 to 7 cm wide.

A small tree up to 11 metres in height. Only found growing near the sea from as far south as Newcastle, New South Wales to  Maryborough, Queensland. Greenish yellow flowers have tiny petals, and form in December. This tree features typical red and black fruit of this genus, maturing from March to July.

References

External links

coriaceus
Flora of New South Wales
Flora of Queensland
Sapindales of Australia